Sanhaitha  is no more a Village Development Committee (VDC), it is Municipality-19, Siraha (Nepal) now. Municipality in Siraha District in the Sagarmatha Zone of south-eastern Nepal. As per data available around 30,000 people are living in 4700 individual households in 2078 B.S.

References

External links
UN map of the municipalities of  Siraha District

Populated places in Siraha District